Hoyt Richard Murdoch (August 16, 1946 – June 15, 1996) was an American professional wrestler, better known by his ring names "Dirty" Dick Murdoch and "Captain Redneck". He was best known for his time in the World Wrestling Federation and New Japan Pro-Wrestling.

Murdoch started his wrestling career in 1965, and three years later, he began teaming with longtime partner Dusty Rhodes as the Texas Outlaws. After they split up, Murdoch wrestled for several territories including the National Wrestling Alliance, Florida Championship Wrestling, and Mid-South Wrestling, also touring overseas. He would join the World Wrestling Federation in 1984 and teamed with Adrian Adonis to form the North-South Connection, winning the WWF Tag Team Championship.

In 1981, Murdoch gained international exposure by joining New Japan Pro-Wrestling and stayed there until 1989. He later wrestled for Jim Crockett Promotions, engaging in feuds with the likes of Ric Flair, Nikita Koloff, and Dusty Rhodes. He also worked for World Championship Wrestling in 1991 in a tag team with Dick Slater until going into semi-retirement, while making appearances at the 1995 Royal Rumble and Slamboree 1993: A Legends' Reunion.

Early life
Murdoch was born in Waxahachie, Texas. A second-generation wrestler, the stepson of 1950s Texas wrestler Frankie Hill Murdoch, he grew up with fellow second-generation wrestlers Dory Funk Jr. and Terry Funk, watching their fathers wrestle all around Texas. Frank Murdoch held the NWA Southwest Junior Heavyweight Championship three times in his career. Dick attended Caprock High School, where he took part in amateur wrestling.

Professional wrestling career

Early career (1965–1981) 

Murdoch started wrestling in 1965 as "Ron Carson" in a tag team with Don Carson. He soon started wrestling under his real name. In 1968, he formed a tag team that would continue throughout the early 1970s with Dusty Rhodes called The Texas Outlaws, and during that time he adopted his Dick Murdoch name. After splitting with Rhodes, he wrestled for several territories within the National Wrestling Alliance, most famously Florida Championship Wrestling and also wrestled in Mid-South Wrestling. Also, during that time, Murdoch would partially wrestle with All Japan Pro-Wrestling, feuding with Giant Baba, The Destroyer, Genichiro Tenryu and Jumbo Tsuruta. His most famous matches there were a Two Out Of Three Falls match against Harley Race for the NWA World Heavyweight Championship on May 8, 1979, which ended in a draw (1–1) after time limit expired, and the other one also being a Two Out Of Three Falls against Jumbo Tsuruta for the NWA United National Championship on March 5, 1980, with Tsuruta defeating Murdoch (2–1). Even though Murdoch wrestled there for so long, he didn't get too much exposure like his fellow foreigners would, and wrestled his last match on March 3, 1981 in a tag team match involving him and Mario Milano losing to Jumbo Tsuruta and Tiger Toguchi.

Mid-South Wrestling (1980–1985) 
Murdoch's most noted work as a wrestler came in Mid-South Wrestling in the early 1980s, where he teamed with Junkyard Dog. The pair was the most popular champions in the region, attracting the hardcore, working-class white fans with his "Captain Redneck" persona and JYD drawing the support of the black fan base. Their feud with the Fabulous Freebirds was perhaps Mid-South's most compelling storyline.

World Wrestling Federation (1983–1985)

North-South Connection 
In 1984, Murdoch went to the World Wrestling Federation and formed a tag team with Adrian Adonis called "North-South Connection", since Adrian was a New York (North) native while Dick was a Texas (South) native. Both men were involved in a series of vignettes alongside Mean Gene Okerlund, with both men visiting each other's hometowns, not being used with each other's urban and country lifestyles. They captured the World Tag Team Titles, defending them against Jack and Jerry Brisco, Barry Windham and Mike Rotunda, The Wild Samoans, Paul Roma and Salvatore Bellomo, and many other teams. He left the WWF in 1985 after dropping the tag-team title to The U.S. Express for Mid-South, while Adonis left to wrestle in Japan.

New Japan Pro-Wrestling (1981–1989) 
In 1981, Murdoch started what truly would be his international exposure, by wrestling for New Japan Pro-Wrestling. He entered the MSG Tag League of that year, teaming with fellow Texan Stan Hansen, with the team finishing 3rd place with 36 points, scoring victories over teams such as El Canek and Super Maquina, Riki Choshu and Yoshiaki Yatsu, Seiji Sakaguchi and Kengo Kimura and Antonio Inoki and Tatsumi Fujinami.

In 1982, Murdoch returned for the MSG League 1982 tournament, finishing 4th place with 41 points, scoring victories over wrestlers like The Iron Sheik, Seiji Sakaguchi, Tatsumi Fujinami, Don Muraco and Tiger Toguchi. He also engaged in a few encounters with Hulk Hogan, which ended in double count-out or with Murdoch being disqualified. He once again entered the MSG Tag League, this time with the Masked Superstar with the team finishing 4th place with 21 points, scoring victories over teams such as El Canek and Perro Aguayo, Tiger Toguchi and Killer Khan and Dino Bravo and Murdoch's future tag team partner Adrian Adonis.

In 1983, he mainly feuded with Riki Choshu's Ishin Gundan, mainly wrestling Choshu, Killer Khan, Animal Hamaguchi and Yoshiaki Yatsu. He also teamed with Paul Orndorff and Adrian Adonis against the Gundan and a few New Japan's loyalists such as Osamu Kido, Seiji Sakaguchi and Kengo Kimura. He would once again enter the MSG Tag League of that year, this time teaming with Adonis, with the team reaching the finals with 27.5 points, in a losing effort against the winners Antonio Inoki and Hulk Hogan. A year later, after his team with Adonis officialized while both were in the WWF, they started regularly to team up against New Japan's top tag-team contenders and having iconic encounters against Inoki, Fujinami, Andre The Giant, Gerry Morow, Strong Machines (#1 and #2) and other top threats. Both men individually entered the MSG League, in which Murdoch finished 5th place with 30 points, defeating Ken Patera, Big John Quinn, Otto Wanz and even his own partner Adonis. The team of Murdoch and Adonis entered the MSG Tag League of that year, once again reaching the finals with 23 points, but again coming up short against the winners Inoki and Fujinami.

In 1985, Murdoch entered the IWGP League, a single-elimination system-styled tournament, defeating Kengo Kimura in the first round, advancing to the quarterfinals in which he defeated Seiji Sakaguchi, until losing to Andre the Giant in the semifinals. He and Adonis were wrestling in Japan while both were WWF Tag Team Champions, at one point successfully defending both belts against Kengo Kimura and Tatsumi Fujinami. After both men left the WWF, they wrestled full-time with New Japan Pro-Wrestling, once competing for the vacated WWF International Tag Team Championship against the team they defended their national belts, Kimura and Fujinami, in a losing effort. They tried to gain them in a rematch, but both men came up short. After failing to win the belts, Murdoch and Adonis partied ways and each man went singles competition. Murdoch would resume his singles career by feuding with Inoki and Fujinami, and also having bloody encounters with Abdullah The Butcher and Bruiser Brody. He reunited with the Masked Superstar to compete in the IWGP Tag Team League of that year, with both men finishing 4th place with 19 points, defeating the Kelly Twins (Mike and Pat), Dos Caras and El Canek, and Kendo Nagasaki and Mr. Pogo. In 1986, Murdoch started to feud with the new breed of wrestlers, such as Keiji Mutoh, Shinya Hashimoto, Tatsutoshi Goto and UWF crusaders Akira Maeda, Nobuhiko Takada, as well as veterans like Osamu Kido and Yoshiaki Fujiwara. Murdoch participated in the IWGP League of that year, wrestling his way to the finals, where he lost to Inoki. Later, he and Masked Superstar took another shot at the IWGP Tag Team League tournament, reaching the semifinals where they lost to Akira Maeda and Osamu Kido.

The following year saw Murdoch not having much exposure, as he was wrestling often in tag team action alongside younger foreign wrestlers, such as Scott Hall, Owen Hart, Matt Borne and The Cuban Assassin. Later, he found an uncommon tag team partnership with Inoki as both men competed in the Japan Cup Tag Team League together. They wrestled their way to the finals, where both men lost to Kengo Kimura and Tatsumi Fujinami.

In 1988, Adrian Adonis returned to NJPW, immediately reuniting with Murdoch, reforming their tag team, and later forming a trio with Owen Hart. Murdoch and Adonis' only title match occurred on June 23, where they unsuccessfully faced reigning IWGP Tag Team Champions Masa Saito and Riki Choshu. The duo teamed together until Adonis' death on July 4, and after that date, Murdoch would not return to Japan for 5 months. In November 1988, Murdoch returned to NJPW, taking part into the Japan Cup Tag Team Elimination League, a round-robin tournament of trios consisting of six-man tag team elimination matches. Murdoch teamed up with Scott Hall and Bob Orton Jr., wrestling their first tournament match on November 17, defeating the six-man combination of Antonio Inoki, Riki Choshu and Kantaro Hoshino, with Murdoch last eliminating Inoki with Orton's assistance. They suffered their first loss at the hands of Masa Saito, Tatsutoshi Goto and Seiji Sakaguchi, but quickly rebounded by defeating Super Strong Machine, The Tiger and The Jaguar, with Murdoch last eliminating the Strong Machine. They later defeated Kengo Kimura, Yoshiaki Fujiwara and Osamu Kido, even though Murdoch got eliminated by Kimura during the match, his team got the win after Orton last eliminated Fujiwara. Their winning streak continued when they defeated George Takano, Steve Armstrong and Tracy Smothers, after Murdoch last eliminated Takano. However, they suffered another loss at the hands of Tatsumi Fujinami, Shinya Hashimoto and Masahiro Chono, but once again quickly rebounded by defeating Hiro Saito, Shiro Koshinaka and Kuniaki Kobayashi, after Murdoch eliminated Kobayashi and Saito. After defeating Buzz Sawyer, Manny Fernandez and Kendo Nagasaki by forfeit, they once again faced the Saito, Sakaguchi and Goto combination. In what would seem to be another loss after Hall and Orton were the two first eliminated, Murdoch single handedly eliminated Sakaguchi and Saito, before finally making quick work out of Goto, eliminating him and avenging their loss. However, the team couldn't reach the finals due to the two losses they suffered.

The year of 1989 saw Murdoch's last stand with New Japan, as he briefly returned in July, facing the likes of Shinya Hashimoto, Hiroshi Hase, Vladimir Berkovich, and Evgeny Artyukhin. His last match occurred on August 5, where he defeated Berkovich. Murdoch never wrestled for New Japan ever again after that year.

Jim Crockett Promotions/World Championship Wrestling (1986–1989; 1991) 
He briefly wrestled in Mid-South Wrestling again, before turning up in the NWA's Jim Crockett Promotions in 1986 as a babyface. He feuded with Ric Flair and attempted to win Flair's NWA World Title. He also teamed with Ron Garvin against Flair and the Four Horsemen. In early 1987, Murdoch turned heel and joined Ivan Koloff and Vladimir Petrov in their attempt to get Nikita Koloff and Dusty Rhodes. Then a NWA United States Tag Team Champion with Ivan, he injured Nikita's neck after a brain-buster suplex on the floor that summer, resulting in his (kayfabe) suspension for 30 days and the team being stripped of the title. He continued wrestling as a heel until summer 1988, when he would turn face again and reunite with Dusty in a feud with Gary Hart's team of Garvin, who had at that time recently turned heel on Rhodes, and Al Perez. He left the NWA and wrestled in the World Wrestling Council and Frontier Martial-Arts Wrestling in 1990, before returning to World Championship Wrestling as one half of the "Hardliners," or "Hardline Collection Agency," with Dick Slater in 1991, once again a heel by this point. They feuded with Rick and Scott Steiner but could not win their title.

Later career (1991–1996) 
After leaving WCW, Murdoch went to Puerto Rico for World Wrestling Council where he won the WWC Television Championship defeating TNT on November 23, 1991. A month later he dropped the title to Invader 1. Then on October 25, 1992, he defeated Invader 1 for the WWC Universal Heavyweight Championship and also a month later he dropped the title to Carlos Colon. During his time in Puero Rico he feuded, with Colon, Invader 1 and Miguel Perez Jr.

He also returned to Japan working for W*ING, WAR and IWA Japan from 1992 to 1994. In May 1993 he returned to WCW's Slamboree 1993: A Legends' Reunion where he teamed with Don Muraco and Jimmy Snuka against Blackjack Mulligan, Jim Brunzell and Wahoo McDaniel in a non-contest. That June, he made a one-night appearance for Extreme Championship Wrestling's Super Summer Sizzler Spectacular where he defeated Dark Patriot II. From 1993 to 1994 he worked in Smoky Mountain Wrestling being managed by Jim Cornette where they feuded with Bob Armstrong. Later in his career he worked in Texas on the independent circuit where he feuded with Black Bart, Kevin Von Erich and Greg Valentine.

Murdoch was the twenty-seventh entrant in the 1995 WWF Royal Rumble. He was eliminated by Henry O. Godwinn. That May, he wrestled Wahoo McDaniel in a black-and-white "Legends Match" at Slamboree. In March 1996, he defeated Vampire Warrior and The Viking in Kuantan, Malaysia, then he made his last appearance in Japan on the May 23 main event of a Pro Wrestling Fujiwara Gumi show in Tokyo, losing to Yoshiaki Fujiwara. His last match was a victory over Rod Price at a show in Amarillo, Texas on June 6, 1996.

Personal life
Murdoch was married on September 21, 1966 in Potter County, Texas to Janice Hix. Together, they had one child before divorcing on October 1, 1973.

Murdoch is the cousin of wrestler Killer Tim Brooks.

Murdoch appeared in four movies: The Wrestler (1974), Paradise Alley (1978), Grunt! The Wrestling Movie (1985), and Manhattan Merengue! (1995). He also appeared on an episode of Learning The Ropes and an episode of The Jerry Springer Show. Murdoch appeared in various rodeo events and at one point, ran his own bar, "Dirty" Dick's Dive.

Accusations of racism and KKK affiliation
Over the years, several within professional wrestling who knew Murdoch have said he was racist and was a member of the Ku Klux Klan. In a shoot interview, Bad News Brown accused him of being a member of the Klan. This was also mentioned by Tito Santana in his autobiography, Tales From The Ring. Former WWE SmackDown head writer Alex Greenfield also relayed a story told to him by Dusty Rhodes about Murdoch driving him to a Klan party without telling him it was a KKK party beforehand. In 2014, former wrestling star Rocky Johnson, father of Dwayne "The Rock" Johnson, claimed Murdoch was a member of the Klan and that he once knocked him unconscious during a match stating during an interview, "Because he was KKK and didn't like blacks, he kept kicking me hard and punching me. I said, 'you hit me one more time, I'm hitting you back.' He hit me, and I knocked Murdoch out." However, these claims have been disputed by Dick's one time manager Jim Cornette on his podcast.

Other media
Murdoch was featured as a playable character in the 2001 video game Fire Pro Wrestling and 2007 video game Wrestle Kingdom 2.

Death
Murdoch died of a heart attack on June 15, 1996, at the age of 49. He was found dead at 4:30 AM on a couch in his living room by his ex-wife. Murdoch suffered from high blood pressure in later years and had no prior heart problems.

Championships and accomplishments
All Japan Pro Wrestling
NWA United National Championship (1 time)
Central States Wrestling
NWA Central States Heavyweight Championship (2 times)
NWA Central States Tag Team Championship (1 time) – with Bob Brown
NWA North American Tag Team Championship (Central States version) (3 times) – with Dusty Rhodes (1) and Bob Sweetan (2)
Championship Wrestling from Florida
NWA Florida Tag Team Championship (2 times) – with Dusty Rhodes (1), Bobby Duncum (1)
NWA Southern Heavyweight Championship (Florida version) (1 time)
Gulf Coast Championship Wrestling
NWA Gulf Coast Tag Team Championship (1 time) – with Don Carson
Jim Crockett Promotions
NWA United States Tag Team Championship (1 time) – with Ivan Koloff
NWA Big Time Wrestling
NWA American Tag Team Championship (1 time) – with Dusty Rhodes
NWA Detroit
NWA World Tag Team Championship (Detroit version) (1 time) – with Dusty Rhodes
NWA Mid-America
NWA World Tag Team Championship (Mid-America version) (1 time) – with Don Carson
NWA Tri-State / Mid-South Wrestling Association
Mid-South North American Championship (2 times)
Mid-South Tag Team Championship (3 times) – with Junkyard Dog
NWA North American Heavyweight Championship (Tri-State version) (3 times)
NWA Tri-State Brass Knuckles Championship (1 time)
NWA United States Tag Team Championship (Tri-State version) (2 times) – with Killer Karl Kox (1), Ted DiBiase (1)
NWA Western States Sports
NWA Brass Knuckles Championship (Amarillo version) (3 times)
NWA International Heavyweight Championship (Amarillo version) (3 times)
NWA Western States Heavyweight Championship (1 time)
NWA Western States Tag Team Championship (3 times) – with Bobby Duncum (1) and Blackjack Mulligan (2) 
National Wrestling Federation
NWF World Tag Team Championship (1 time) – with Dusty Rhodes
Professional Wrestling Hall of Fame
Class of 2013
Pro Wrestling Illustrated
PWI Most Inspirational Wrestler of the Year (1974)
PWI ranked him #96 of the top 500 singles wrestlers of the "PWI Years" in 2003
St. Louis Wrestling Club
NWA Missouri Heavyweight Championship (3 times)
St. Louis Wrestling Hall of Fame
Class of 2010
World Championship Wrestling (Australia)
IWA World Tag Team Championship (2 times) – with Lars Anderson (1), Dusty Rhodes (1)
World Wrestling Council
WWC Universal Heavyweight Championship (1 time)
WWC World Television Championship (3 times)
World Wrestling Federation
WWF Tag Team Championship (1 time) – with Adrian Adonis

See also
 List of premature professional wrestling deaths

References

External links 

 
 

1946 births
1996 deaths
American male professional wrestlers
Expatriate professional wrestlers in Japan
American Ku Klux Klan members
People from Waxahachie, Texas
Professional wrestlers from Texas
Professional Wrestling Hall of Fame and Museum
Stampede Wrestling alumni
Western States Sports
20th-century professional wrestlers
WWC Universal Heavyweight Champions
WWC Television Champions
NWF World Tag Team Champions
NWA Florida Heavyweight Champions
NWA Florida Tag Team Champions
NWA Southern Heavyweight Champions (Florida version)
NWA United National Champions
IWA World Tag Team Champions (Australia)
NWA/WCW United States Tag Team Champions